The 1926 LEN European Aquatics Championships took place in Budapest, Hungary between 18 and 26 August 1926. At these inaugural championships, only men were allowed to compete.

Medal table

Medal summary

Diving

Swimming

Water polo

See also
List of European Championships records in swimming

References

European Aquatics Championships, 1926
LEN European Aquatics Championships
International aquatics competitions hosted by Hungary
European Aquatics
European Aquatics Championships
1920s in Budapest
European Aquatics Championships